The adjustable bend is a bend knot that is easy to lengthen or shorten. 

A rolling hitch is used to tie the end of each rope to the standing part of the other. Clifford Ashley suggested it for tying guy ropes.

References

See also
List of bend knots
 List of knots